Abdul Samad Isyaku Rabiu  (born 4 August 1960) is a Nigerian billionaire businessman and philanthropist. His late father, Khalifah Isyaku Rabiu, was one of Nigeria's foremost industrialists in the 1970s and 1980s. Abdul Samad is the founder and chairman of BUA Group, a Nigerian conglomerate concentrating on manufacturing, infrastructure and agriculture and producing a revenue in excess of $2.5 billion. He is also the chairman of the Nigerian Bank of Industry (BOI).

On 7 July 2020, Forbes estimated Rabiu's wealth at $3.2 billion, putting him 716th in the global billionaire's club. In January 2022, he was reported to be the second richest man in Nigeria. In April 2022 he was reported to be the fifth-richest man in Africa, with a net worth of $6.7 billion. In January 2023, Rabiu was reported to have become the 4th richest man in Africa.

Early life 

Abdul Samad Rabiu was born and raised in Kano in the north-western part of Nigeria. He attended Capital University in Columbus, Ohio and returned to Nigeria at the age of 24 to oversee the family business. This was when his father Isyaku Rabiu was being detained by the administration of General Muhammadu Buhari for allegedly not paying rice import duties.

Business 

Abdul Samad Rabiu established BUA International Limited in 1988 for the sole purpose of commodity trading. The company imported rice, edible oil, flour, and iron and steel.

In 1990, the government, which owned Delta Steel Company, contracted with BUA to supply its raw materials in exchange for finished products. This provided a much-needed windfall for the young company. BUA expanded further into steel, producing billets, importing iron ore, and constructing multiple rolling mills in Nigeria.

Years later, BUA acquired Nigerian Oil Mills Limited, the largest edible oil processing company in Nigeria. In 2005 BUA started two flour-milling plants, in Lagos and in Kano. By 2008, BUA had broken an eight-year monopoly in the Nigerian sugar industry by commissioning the second-largest sugar refinery in sub-Saharan Africa. In 2009 the company went on to acquire a controlling stake in a publicly-listed Cement Company in Northern Nigeria and began to construct a $900 million cement plant in Edo State, completing it in early 2015.

Philanthropy 

Abdul Samad Rabiu uses the BUA Foundation for his philanthropic activities. These include the construction of a 7,000-square-meter paediatric ward at the Aminu Kano Teaching Hospital and the construction of the Centre for Islamic Studies at Bayero University Kano amongst several others.

Personal life 
Abdul Samad is married with children: Isyaku Rabiu, Junaid Rabiu, Rukaiya Rania Rabiu and Khadijah Rabiu. He has 42 siblings including Nafiu Rabiu and Rabiu Rabiu, the chairman of IRS Airlines.

Award
In October 2022, a Nigerian national honour of Commander of the Order of the Federal Republic (CFR) was conferred on him by President Muhammadu Buhari.

References

1960 births
Living people
Nigerian billionaires
People from Kano
Capital University alumni
20th-century Nigerian businesspeople
21st-century Nigerian businesspeople
People from Kano State
Businesspeople from Kano